Matthieu Boujenah (born 23 June 1976 in Bagneux, Hauts-de-Seine, Paris) is a French comedian and actor. He is the nephew of Michel Boujenah and Paul Boujenah. His sister is actress Lucie Boujenah.

Selected filmography

External links
 

1976 births
French comedians
Living people
French male film actors
French male television actors
People from Bagneux, Hauts-de-Seine
French Jews